This is a list of Arizona Wildcats head baseball coaches. The Arizona Wildcats baseball program is a college baseball team that represents the University of Arizona in the Pac-12 Conference in the National Collegiate Athletic Association. The team has seen 17 individuals hold the head coach position since it started playing organized baseball in the 1904 season. 3 of these coaches had non-consecutive tenures.

Since 1950 - which the university considers the beginning of its modern baseball program - only six people have held the position.

The current coach is Chip Hale, who helmed his first season in 2022.

Having served for 33 seasons, J.F. "Pop" McKale is the longest tenured coach in program history. Jerry Kindall holds the record for wins at 860. Kindall won 3 College World Series titles while in Tucson, and Andy Lopez won 1. Frank Sancet, Jerry Kindall and Andy Lopez have all been inducted into the National College Baseball Hall of Fame.

Key

Coaches

Notes

References 

Lists of college baseball head coaches in the United States

Arizona Wildcats baseball coaches